Joachim Halupczok (3 June 1968 – 5 February 1994) was a Polish racing cyclist. He won the silver medal in the team time trial at the 1988 Summer Olympics along with Andrzej Sypytkowski, Marek Leśniewski and Zenon Jaskuła.

In 1989 he became the amateur champion at the 1989 UCI Road World Championships.

In 1990 he signed professional terms and took part in the World Championships in Utsunomiya, Japan. He finished the World Championship course :08 behind the winner within a peloton of the best riders in the world including Gianni Bugno, Greg Lemond, Pedro Delgado, Sean Kelly and Miguel Indurain. He was later diagnosed with cardiac arrhythmia, which meant that he had to quit professional cycling. It was suspected that the cause of his health problems was the use of EPO. Professor Romuald Lewicki from Zakład Medycyny Sportowej WAM in Lodz (Institute of Sports Medicine) claims that Halupczok's 
cardiac arrhythmia was genetic because his father and son suffer from the same condition.

Death
Halupczok died on the way to the hospital, after he collapsed during a warm-up for a charity indoor football tournament in Opole on 5 February 1994. The autopsy has shown that he has not died of a heart attack. He left wife and two children.

References

1968 births
1994 deaths
People from Opole County
Sportspeople from Opole Voivodeship
Polish male cyclists
Cyclists at the 1988 Summer Olympics
Olympic cyclists of Poland
Olympic silver medalists for Poland
Olympic medalists in cycling
Medalists at the 1988 Summer Olympics
20th-century Polish people